Clinus robustus, the Robust klipfish, is a species of clinid that occurs in subtropical waters of the Atlantic Ocean around South Africa where it can be found in the subtidal zone in areas with plentiful seaweed growth.  This species can reach a maximum length of  TL.

References

robustus
Fish described in 1908
Taxa named by John Dow Fisher Gilchrist
Taxa named by William Wardlaw Thompson